Bayview Glen School (also known as Bayview Glen or BVG) is a co-educational independent school in Toronto, Ontario, Canada established in 1962. The school is located in the northern district North York of Toronto.

The school occupies two campuses, the preschool (age 2 to Junior Kindergarten) and lower school (Senior Kindergarten to Grade 5) are on the campus located on Duncan Mill Road. Across the street is the Moatfield Drive campus, which houses the prep school (Grades 6 to 8) and the upper school (Grades 9 to 12). Bayview Glen is a member of Round Square and CISAA.

History
Bayview Glen was founded in 1962 by L. Doreen (née Barwick) Hopkins as a nursery school and day camp. The school initially was housed in a barn in the Don River Valley near Crescent School. The site now hosts Crestwood school.

By 1964, Bayview Glen had expanded to include students from age two to Grade 1, and an adjoining property was acquired. By 1969, new buildings had been added and the school grew to include students through to Grade 6.

In 1980, Hopkins died, and the L. Doreen Hopkins Foundation took control in overseeing the school. A permanent facility replaced the barn. Space for an upper school was leased from an engineering firm. In 1985, four teachers, and a grade 7 and 8 class opened the renovated office space. Through the rest of the decade, one grade per year was added. In 1989, the valley property was sold and the lower school moved to the Duncan Mill Campus.

In 1991, The Doreen Hopkins Foundation was taken over by the Macmarmon Foundation and Terry Guest was appointed Headmaster. Also in 1991 Bayview Glen had its first graduating class. In 1998, Bayview Glen acquired the upper school campus located on Moatfield Drive.

In September 2000, the upper school was opened by The Duke of York. The site was complete with a double gymnasium and theatre complex. In 2001, Guest left Bayview Glen and took up the position of Executive Director of Round Square, of which the school is a member. He was succeeded by Stuart Grainger, who was Headmaster until 2003. He is currently the headmaster of Trinity College School in Port Hope.

Eileen Daunt was appointed Head of School in 2003. 

Bayview Glen celebrated its 50th anniversary during the 2011–12 academic year.  Diana and Simion Kronenfelds raised money for building a  school facilities, which was later named to honor the notable contributors.

In 2012–2014, Bayview Glen underwent renovations and a building was constructed that would bring the prep school and upper school together. In the spring of 2014, the new Moatfield Campus was reopened by Prince Andrew, on his second visit to the school. The campus offers facilities such as a double gym, an expanded dining hall, a theatre gallery, an alumni hall, new classrooms for specific areas of study, and lounge areas.

In 2022, Eileen Daunt announced her retirement as Head of School, and was preceded by James Lee.

Upcoming projects

Between 2019 and 2021, a new athletics centre will be built, which is taking the place of a several decade-old outside pool area and an inside basketball court for a new building that will have a combination of an indoor pool, for the primary use of their swim team, and an interior gym. This facility will be used for the "lower-school", or students from JK up to grade 5.

Athletics

The school mascot is the Gryphon – representing speed and majesty with its body of a lion and head of an eagle.

There are workout facilities, a gymnasium and a rock-climbing wall. One playing field is adjacent to the lower school and an artificial turf field is behind the upper school.

In the 2016–2017 academic year, Bayview Glen sports teams won 31 CISAA Championships, surpassing the old record of 16 achieved during the 2012–2013 academic year. Every age group from Under-11 to Under-20 was represented on the roster of champions.

House system
Bayview Glen has four houses. Originally named after four Canadian prime ministers, in November 2020 it was officially announced that Bayview Glen would undergo changes to the House System, including renaming the houses. In February of 2022, the houses were renamed. Every student is placed in one of these houses, with the houses competing against each other at sports related events within the student body.

Falcon (Green)
Bear (Red)
Wolf (Purple)
Lynx (Blue)

In the media
Bayview Glen's facilities have appeared in the movie Kiss and Cry (film), based on the story of one of their alumni Carley Allison (Class of 2013), starring Degrassi: The Next Generation co-stars Luke Bilyk and fellow alumna Sarah Fisher

Notable alumni
 J. Miles Dale 1968 - film producer
 Rawlson King 1995 - politician
Zubin Surkari 1995 - Canadian national cricketer
Bree Williamson 1998 - actress
Moez Kassam 1999 - hedge fund manager
 Lisa Sonshine 2000 - children's entertainer, member of Sonshine and Broccoli
Garen Boyajian 2005 - actor
Len Väljas 2006 - cross-country skier
 Sarah Fisher 2011 - actress best known for her role on Degrassi: The Next Generation
 Carley Elle Allison 2013 - elite skater and singer who was diagnosed with a rare form of cancer called clear-cell sarcoma of the trachea
 Jordyn Listro 2013 - soccer player for the Canada women's national soccer team
 Yazmeen Jamieson 2016 - soccer player for the Jamaica women's national football team
Elliotte Friedman - sports journalist

References

External links
Official web site
Profile at the Education Quality and Accountability Office (EQAO) website
Our Kids Profile

Round Square schools
High schools in Toronto
Educational institutions established in 1962
Elementary schools in Toronto
1962 establishments in Ontario
Private schools in Toronto